The Journal of Cancer Research and Therapeutics is a peer-reviewed open access medical journal published by  Medknow Publications on behalf of the Association of Radiation Oncology of India. The journal covers research in oncology, radiation oncology, medical imaging, radiation protection, non-ionising radiation, and radiobiology.

The journal has a 2021 impact factor of 1.331. It is currently abstracted and indexed in PubMed, MEDLINE, Scopus, and others.

References

External links 
 

Open access journals
Quarterly journals
English-language journals
Oncology journals
Medknow Publications academic journals
Cancer in India
Academic journals associated with learned and professional societies